Gorgoch; formerly known as Korchlu, Gorchulu, is a village in the Kotayk Province of Armenia. It is included in the community of Meghradzor village.

See also 
Kotayk Province

References

Populated places in Kotayk Province